The Autodromo di Pergusa is an automobile and motorcycle circuit that encircles the only Sicilian natural lake, Pergusa Lake. The circuit is also known as Enna-Pergusa, as the lake is located near the city of Enna.

Overview

During the 1960s, the track hosted various sportscar events such as the Coppa Città di Enna and later in the 1970s the Coppa Florio. It also played host to a non-championship Formula One event known as the Mediterranean Grand Prix. In 1989 the Italian round of the World Superbike Championship was held here. In the 1990s, the track was upgraded and hosted events for the FIA Sportscar Championship, FIA GT Championship, and Formula 3000. In 1997 the track was also the location of the Ferrari festival.

The last round of the 2012 Superstars Series and 2012 International GTSprint Series was held at Pergusa. The circuit hosted a round of the FIA European Touring Car Championship in 2013, 2014 and 2015. The venue hosted a round of the 2015 TCR Italian Series.

The dust and the abrasive nature of the track tended to make the surface very slippery. The Formula 3000 races in particular were also known for very poor standards of organization and marshaling.

Starting in 1974, the Coppa Florio, one of the world's oldest motor races, was revived as a sports car race at Pergusa. The race counted towards the World Sportscar Championship most years from 1975, last being held in 1981. In 2020, Creventic hosted a 12 hour race around the circuit in a two day event on October 10–11 as part of the 2020 24H GT Series, again reviving the Coppa Florio name.

Lap records

The official race lap records at the Autodromo di Pergusa (Enna-Pergusa) are listed as:

Notes

References

External links 

 Autodromo di Pergusa Official website in Italian language
 Trackpedia's guide to racing Pergusa

Superbike World Championship circuits
Sports venues in Italy
Motorsport venues in Italy
Enna
1960s establishments in Italy